Naumenko is a Ukrainian-language surname. It may refer to:

 Aleksandr Naumenko (footballer, born 1997), Russian footballer
 Anatoliy Naumenko (born 1998), Ukrainian footballer
 Gregg Naumenko (born 1977), American ice hockey player
 Irina Karpova, née Naumenko (born 1980), Kazakhstani heptathlete
 Liudmyla Naumenko (born 1993), Ukrainian basketball player
 Nick Naumenko (born 1974), American ice hockey player
 Mike Naumenko (1955–1991), Soviet musician
 Oleg Naumenko (born 1986), Ukrainian wheelchair fencer
 Olga Naumenko (born 1949), Russian actress
 Pavlo Naumenko (1965–2023), Ukrainian aerospace engineer
 Stepan Naumenko (1920–2004), Soviet pilot
 Vladlen Naumenko (born 1947), Soviet footballer
 Volodymyr Pavlovych Naumenko (1852–1919), Ukrainian pedagogue and community leader
 Vyacheslav Naumenko (1883–1979), Kuban Cossack leader

See also
 

Ukrainian-language surnames